ScerTF  is a comprehensive database of position weight matrices for the  transcription factors of Saccharomyces.

See also
Transcription factor
Gary Stormo

References

External links
 http://stormo.wustl.edu/ScerTF.

Biological databases
Gene expression